The Swiss Chess Championship is held annually during two weeks of July. It is organised by the Swiss Chess Federation (the SSB), which has been a member of the overall governing body, Swiss Olympic, since 2000. The SSB is itself a relatively new organising body, created in 1995 as a fusion of two older organisations; these were the former Swiss Chess Federation (the SSV, founded 1889 for the inaugural Championship and prior to 1960, known as the Swiss Chess Association) and the Swiss Worker Chess Federation (the SASB, founded 1923).

From its inception, the Championship format was a 10-player all-play-all, open to both nationals and overseas players. The title of Swiss Champion was however reserved for the highest placed Swiss national. Various changes have been implemented along the way, particularly in respect of the introduction of new Championship categories. The two world wars prevented the Championship from taking place on a small number of occasions, but due to Switzerland's neutral status, the event was less badly affected than in many other countries. There was no competition held in 1968 due to the clash with the Chess Olympiad held in Lugano.

In 2008 the Championship underwent major changes, including running two alternate formats effectively in parallel. The changes were aimed at keeping the tournament accessible to home and overseas players, while expanding the range of opportunities for nationals, both in terms of the Championship itself and also for Elo rating and title seeking purposes. This radically different approach gave rise to a two-year cycle, comprising an open tournament every odd year and a closed (Swiss nationals only) tournament every even year.

Since 2018, the Championship is conducted as an annual, closed, 10-Player Single Round Robin Invitational featuring the best Swiss chess players. Since 2019, The Women's title is distributed in a 6-Player Double Round Robin Invitational. The title for Swiss Junior Champion is awarded to the best placed U20-player in the parallel Master Tournament. Whilst both closed title tournaments are reserved for Switzerland's chess elite, The Master Tournament still features many foreign players. Yet, only Swiss players are eligible for the U20 title. Furthermore, the best placed Swiss player is awarded a spot in the title tournament of the following year.

Throughout the event's long history, several players have won multiple titles, but Hans Johner earns a special mention for his 12 titles, spanning an incredible forty-two years (1908–1950). Joe Gallagher, a seven-times Champion, has dual nationality and also won the British Championship in 2001, a unique achievement.

Open Champions

| valign="top" |
{| class="sortable wikitable"
! Year !! Venue !! Men's champion
|-
| 1934 || Zürich || Hans Johner
|-
| 1935 || Aarau || Hans Johner
|-
| 1936 || Luzern || Oskar Naegeli
|-
| 1937 || Interlaken || Hans Johner
|-
| 1938 || Basel || Hans Johner 
|-
| 1939 || Montreux || Henri Grob 
|-
| 1941 || Aarau, Basel  Bern, Zürich || Fritz Gygli 
|-
| 1942 || Lausanne || Jules Ehrat
|-
| 1943 || St. Gallen || Martin Christoffel 
|-
| 1944 || Vevey || Paulin Lob
|-
| 1945 || Lugano || Martin Christoffel
|-
| 1946 || Winterthur || Ernst Strehle 
|-
| 1947 || Neuenburg || Hans Johner 
|-
| 1948 || Bern || Martin Christoffel
|-
| 1949 || Schaffhausen || Serge Tordion
|-
| 1950 || Luzern || Hans Johner
|-
| 1951 || Geneva || Henri Grob
|-
| 1952 || Zürich || Martin Christoffel 
|-
| 1953 || Solothurn || Max Blau 
|-
| 1954 || Basel || Josef Kupper  
|-
| 1955 || Rapperswil || Max Blau
|-
| 1956 || Thun || Max Blau 
|-
| 1957 || Lausanne || Josef Kupper
|-
| 1958 || Lugano || Dieter Keller 
|-
| 1959 || Biel || Paulin Lob 
|-
| 1960 || Balgach || Dieter Keller 
|-
| 1961 || Interlaken || Dieter Keller
|-
| 1962 || St. Gallen || Josef Kupper 
|-
| 1963 || Basel || Dieter Keller
|-
| 1964 || Montreux || Marcel Markus  
|-
| 1965 || Bern || Marcel Markus 
|-
| 1966 || Lugano || Edwin Bhend
|-
| 1967 || Biel || Max Blau 
|-
| 1968 ||  || Not held
|-
| 1969 || Luzern || André Lombard
|-
| 1970 || Riehen || André Lombard 
|-
| 1971 || Winterthur || Heinz Schaufelberger 
|-
| 1972 || Locarno || Heinz Schaufelberger 
|-
| 1973 || Weggis || André Lombard 
|-
| 1974 || Wettingen || André Lombard  
|-
| 1975 || Zürich || Werner Hug
|-
| 1976 || Ascona || Hansjürg Kaenel 
|-
| 1977 || Muttenz || André Lombard 
|-
| 1978 || St. Moritz || Hansjürg Kaenel
|-
| 1979 || Biel || Heinz Wirthensohn 
|-
| 1980 || Ascona || Hansjürg Kaenel 
|-
| 1981 || Biel || Heinz Wirthensohn
|-
| 1982 || Silvaplana || Viktor Korchnoi
|-
| 1983 || Baden || Andreas Huss
|-
| 1984 || Arosa || Viktor Korchnoi
|}
| valign="top" |
{| class="sortable wikitable"
! Year !! Venue !! Men's champion 
|-
| 1985 || Silvaplana || Viktor Korchnoi
|-
| 1986 || Basel || Markus Klauser
|-
| 1987 || Lenk || Richard Gerber 
|-
| 1988 || Silvaplana || Roland Ekström
|-
| 1989 || Biel || Beat Züger 
|-
| 1990 || Arosa || Ivan Nemet 
|-
| 1991 || Chiasso || Jean Luc Costa 
|-
| 1992 || Leukerbad || Heinz Wirthensohn 
|-
| 1993 || Silvaplana || Jean Luc Costa 
|-
| 1994 || Luzern || Lucas Brunner 
|-
| 1995 || Villars, Ollon || Yannick Pelletier 
|-
| 1996 || Arosa || Viktor Gavrikov 
|-
| 1997 || Silvaplana || Joe Gallagher 
|-
| 1998 || Engelberg || Joe Gallagher
|-
| 1999 || Grächen || Roland Ekström  
|-
| 2000 || Pontresina || Yannick Pelletier
|-
| 2001 || Scuol || Roland Ekström 
|-
| 2002 || Leukerbad || Yannick Pelletier 
|-
| 2003 || Silvaplana || Florian Jenni
|-
| 2004 || Samnaun || Joe Gallagher 
|-
| 2005 || Saas Almagell || Joe Gallagher 
|-
| 2006 || Lenzerheide || Florian Jenni
|-
| 2007 || Leukerbad ||Joe Gallagher 
|-
| 2008 || Samnaun ||Roland Ekström
|-
| 2009 || Grächen ||Viktor Korchnoi 
|-
| 2010 || Lenzerheide || Yannick Pelletier
|-
| 2011 || Leukerbad || Viktor Korchnoi
|-
| 2012 || Flims || Joe Gallagher 
|-
| 2013 || Grächen || Alexandra Kosteniuk
|-
| 2014 || Bern || Yannick Pelletier
|-
| 2015 || Leukerbad || Vadim Milov
|-
| 2016 || Flims || Noel Studer
|-
| 2017 || Grächen || Yannick Pelletier
|-
| 2018 || Lenzerheide || Sebastian Bogner
|-
| 2019 || Leukerbad || Noel Studer
|-
| 2020 ||  || Not held
|-
| 2021 || Flims || Joe Gallagher
|}
|}

Women's Champions

| valign="top" |
{| class="sortable wikitable"
! Year !! Venue !! Women's champion
|-
| 1990||Arosa||Silvia Schladetzky
|-
| 1991||Chiasso||Claude Baumann
|-
| 1992||Leukerbad||Evi Grünenwald-Reimer
|-
| 1993||Silvaplana||Barbara Hund
|-
| 1994||Luzern||Shahanah Schmid
|-
| 1995||Villars, Ollon||Tatiana Lematschko
|-
| 1996||Arosa||Evi Grünenwald-Reimer
|-
| 1997||Silvaplana||Tatiana Lematschko
|-
| 1998||Engelberg||Catherine Thürig
|-
| 1999||Grächen||Shahanah Schmid
|-
| 2000||Pontresina||Evi Grünenwald-Reimer
|-
| 2001||Scuol||Monika Seps
|-
| 2002||Leukerbad||Monika Seps
|-
| 2003||Silvaplana||Tatiana Lematschko
|-
| 2004||Samnaun||Tatiana Lematschko
|-
| 2005||Saas Almagell||Monika Seps
|-
| 2006||Lenzerheide||Tatiana Lematschko
|-
| 2007||Leukerbad||Monika Seps
|-
| 2008 || Samnaun || Tatjana Lematschko
|-
| 2009 || Grächen || Tatjana Lematschko
|-
| 2010 || Lenzerheide || Tatjana Lematschko
|-
| 2011 || Leukerbad || Alexandra Kosteniuk
|-
| 2012 || Flims || Monika Seps
|-
| 2013 || Grächen || Alexandra Kosteniuk
|-
| 2014 || Bern || Gundula Heinatz
|-
| 2015 || Leukerbad || Alexandra Kosteniuk
|-
| 2016 || Flims || Laura Stoeri
|-
| 2017 || Grächen || Lena Georgescu
|-
| 2018 ||Lenzerheide||Gundula Heinatz
|-
| 2019 || Leukerbad || Elena Sedina
|-
| 2020 || || Not held
|-
| 2021 || Flims || Lena Georgescu

|}
|}

References

SSB list of men's champions
SSB list of women's champions

Chess national championships
Women's chess national championships
Chess in Switzerland
1889 establishments in Switzerland
1889 in chess
Chess